Religion in South America has been a major influence on art, culture, philosophy and law. Christianity is the continent's main religion, with Roman Catholics having the most adherents. Sizeable minorities of non-religious people and adherents of other religions are also present.

Religious freedom 
Currently, all countries in the region in general are separate of the Catholic Church and declared secular states, which guarantees freedom of religion for its inhabitants. However, in Peru and the Dominican Republic, Roman Catholicism serves as the official religion. In both countries Catholic religious education is mandatory, and in most nations Roman Catholicism still sways the population.

Christianity 

According to Pew Research Center 83.43% of the South American population is Christian, although less than half of them are devout.

Catholicism 
In many South American countries Catholicism is the most professed Christian denomination. In  Paraguay, Peru, Colombia and Argentina more than three-quarters of the population is Catholic.
Catholicism was the only religion allowed in the colonial era; the indigenous were forced to abandon their beliefs, although many did not abandon it at all, for example, countries with predominantly Amerindian population such as Bolivia and Peru there is a syncretism between indigenous religions and the Catholic religion, that has occurred since colonial times. In Brazil or Colombia, Catholicism was mixed with certain African rituals.

Protestantism 
Protestantism has had a presence since the nineteenth century, as a minority, but witnessed a strong increase since the 1980's. The majority of Latin American Protestants in general are Pentecostal. Brazil today is the most Protestant country in South America with 22.2% of the population being Protestant, 89% of Brazilian evangelicals are Pentecostal, in Chile they represent 79% of the total evangelicals in that country, 69% in Argentina and 59% in Colombia. On the other part, in Uruguay 66% of evangelicals are Methodist, while only 20% are Pentecostal.

Spiritism 
Brazil is the country with more practitioners in the world of Allan Kardec's codification of the Spiritism, followed by over 12 million people, with 30 to 45 million sympathizers. Most followers of the Spiritism are people that were mostly Catholic, Protestants and Atheists respectively.

Chico Xavier wrote over 490 books, which complements the spiritualist doctrine.

Eastern Orthodoxy 
Eastern Orthodox Christianity was brought to South America by groups of immigrants from several different regions, mainly Eastern Europe and the Middle East. This traditional branch of Eastern Christianity has also spread beyond the boundaries of immigrant communities. There are several Eastern Orthodox ecclesiastical jurisdictions in South America, organized within the Assembly of Canonical Orthodox Bishops of Latin America.

Oriental Orthodoxy 
Several groups of Christian immigrants, mainly from the Middle East, Caucasus, Africa and India, brought Oriental Orthodoxy to the South America. This ancient branch of Eastern Christianity includes several ecclesiastical jurisdictions in the South America, like Coptic Orthodox Church in South America and Syriac Orthodox Church.

Other Christians 
Practitioners of the Church of Jesus Christ of Latter-day Saints and Jehovah's Witnesses religions also are exercised in Latin America.

Other religions 

Argentina has the largest communities of both Jews and Muslims in Latin America. Practitioners of the Judaism, Buddhist, Islamic, Hinduism, Bahá'í Faith, and Shinto denominations and religions also exercised in Latin America.

Hinduism is the second-largest religion in Suriname. According to the 2012 census of Suriname, Hindus constitute 22.3% of the population. Suriname has the second largest percentage of Hindus in the Western Hemisphere, after Guyana (24.8%).

Indigenous creeds and rituals are still practiced in some countries with large percentages of Amerindians, such as Bolivia and Peru.

Statistics 
Country By Religion in South America (2020 estimate):

See also
 Major religious groups
 Religion in Africa
 Religion in Asia
 Religion in Europe
 Religion in Oceania
 Religion in North America

References